Reginald John Simpson Mitchell-Innes (1848-1930) was an Episcopalian priest in the late 19th and early 20th centuries.

Life

He was born in Berwickshire on 19 June 1848 and educated at Trinity College, Glenalmond.

He then studied divinity at Christ Church, Oxford.  Ordained in 1876 he began his ecclesiastical career with a curacy at Edinburgh Cathedral after which he was Rector of Old St Paul's, Edinburgh and then Christ Church, Glasgow before becoming Provost of Inverness Cathedral  in 1911, a post he was to hold for 7 years.

He died in Edinburgh after a period of ill-health on  20 November 1930.

Notes

1848 births
People from Berwickshire
People educated at Glenalmond College
Alumni of Christ Church, Oxford
Provosts of Inverness Cathedral
1930 deaths